Albert Stuivenberg (born 5 August 1970) is a Dutch professional football coach and former player who is currently the assistant manager of  club Arsenal.

Stuivenberg played professionally for SC Telstar and HFC Haarlem, before suffering a serious injury and moving into coaching with Feyenoord and RWD Molenbeek. He then coached the youth team at Al Jazira Club and the Netherlands under-17 and under-21 national teams. He was appointed assistant coach to Louis van Gaal at Manchester United in 2014 before making his managerial debut with Genk in 2017. Stuivenberg became assistant manager to Ryan Giggs for the Wales national team in 2018, before joining Arsenal in December 2019.

Career
Born in Rotterdam, Stuivenberg began his playing career in the academy of his local club, Feyenoord, but was unable to break into the first team and moved to HFC Haarlem. He later joined SC Telstar, but tore cruciate ligaments in 1986, which forced his premature retirement three years later in 1989.

After retiring, Stuivenberg moved into coaching and was educated at the CIOS sports academy in Overveen. In 1992, he was given a job as a youth coach with his former club, Feyenoord, where he later became head of youth in 2001. He spent the 2000–01 season as an assistant first-team coach with Feyenoord's Belgian feeder club, Racing White Daring Molenbeek. After spending 13 years coaching at Feyenoord, working with the likes of Robin van Persie, he moved to the Al Jazira Club in Abu Dhabi, United Arab Emirates in 2004 to head their youth system.

After two years in the Middle East, he returned to the Netherlands to take over as the coach of the under-17s national team. He twice led the team to victory in the UEFA European Under-17 Championship, in 2011 and 2012, leading to his promotion to manage the under-21s. Stuivenberg also scouted for the Royal Dutch Football Association (KNVB) and educated professional coaches at the KNVB Academy.

Manchester United 
In July 2014, Stuivenberg was appointed as an assistant coach at Manchester United by new manager Louis van Gaal, working alongside assistant manager Ryan Giggs. On 23 May 2016, two days after winning the 2016 FA Cup it was announced that Louis van Gaal had been relieved of his management duties. As part of his coaching team, it was also announced that Stuivenberg had departed the club.

Genk and Wales national team 
In January 2017, he started a new coaching job at Genk. He replaced Peter Maes who was sacked because of an unsatisfactory ranking in the Belgian First Division A. Despite leading the club to the quarter-finals of the 2016–17 UEFA Europa League, Stuivenberg was fired on 10 December 2017. In 2018, he was appointed as assistant manager of the Wales national team, working under his former Manchester United colleague Ryan Giggs.

Arsenal 
On 24 December 2019, Stuivenberg was announced as assistant coach to Mikel Arteta at Arsenal F.C. On 26 July 2021, Stuivenberg left his position as Wales assistant coach to focus on his role at Arsenal. On 1 January 2022, Stuivenberg took charge of Arsenal in a 2–1 defeat to Manchester City, as manager Mikel Arteta had tested positive for COVID-19 and was forced to miss the match.

Managerial statistics

Honours

Manager
Netherlands U17
UEFA European Under-17 Championship: 2011, 2012

Assistant
Manchester United
FA Cup: 2015–16

Arsenal
FA Cup: 2019–20
FA Community Shield: 2020

References

1970 births
Living people
Footballers from Rotterdam
Dutch footballers
Dutch football managers
Netherlands youth international footballers
Feyenoord players
HFC Haarlem players
SC Telstar players
Manchester United F.C. non-playing staff
Dutch expatriate sportspeople in England
K.R.C. Genk managers
Arsenal F.C. non-playing staff
Dutch expatriate football managers
Expatriate football managers in Belgium
Dutch expatriate sportspeople in Belgium
Association footballers not categorized by position
Association football coaches